Nallan Chakravartula Krishnamacharyulu (1924–2006) was a scholar, musician, teacher and exponent of the art of hari katha. He belongs to the lineage of Saint Tyagaraja. He was a first generation disciple of Sriman Parupalli Krishnaiyyah pantulu. Being a top grade artist, his reach went above and beyond being a violinist and a musician. He was also a pandit in Sanskrit and Telugu literature who wrote and composed numerous Kritis, yaksha ganas, poems and harikathas. He was awarded the Vaggeyakara award by the Madras music academy in 2005.

Compositions

Notes and references

See also
List of Carnatic composers

References 
  A Tribute to Sri Nallan Chakravartula Krishnamacharyulu
 Thyagaraja Geyartha Kunchika

Carnatic composers
Musicians from Vijayawada
1924 births
2006 deaths
20th-century Indian composers
Indian music educators
Educators from Andhra Pradesh